Demaret is a French surname. Notable people with the surname include:

Jean Eudes Demaret (born 1984), French professional cyclist
Jimmy Demaret (1910–1983), American professional golfer
Michel Demaret (1940–2000), Belgian politician
Paul Demaret (born 1941), Belgian professor and rector

French-language surnames